Elias Bjuhr (born October 17, 1988) is a Swedish ice hockey player. He has played for Modo Hockey and other teams in the Elitserien.

References

External links

1988 births
Lillehammer IK players
Living people
Modo Hockey players
Nyköpings Hockey players
Olofströms IK players
Swedish ice hockey centres